Ricardo Malzoni Conceição (born 5 January 1984), commonly known as Malzoni, is a retired Brazilian footballer.

International career
Adryelson represented Brazil at the 2001 FIFA U-17 World Championship, scoring once against Trinidad and Tobago.

Career statistics

Club

Notes

References

1984 births
Living people
Brazilian footballers
Brazilian expatriate footballers
Brazil youth international footballers
Association football forwards
Coritiba Foot Ball Club players
Fluminense FC players
Joinville Esporte Clube players
Rio Branco Sport Club players
Guarani de Palhoça players
J. Malucelli Futebol players
Omonia Aradippou players
Aris Limassol FC players
Cypriot Second Division players
Cypriot First Division players
Brazilian expatriate sportspeople in Spain
Expatriate footballers in Spain
Brazilian expatriate sportspeople in Italy
Expatriate footballers in Italy
Brazilian expatriate sportspeople in Cyprus
Expatriate footballers in Cyprus
Footballers from Curitiba